Owadaglaea is a genus of moths of the family Noctuidae.

Species
 Owadaglaea chloromixta Hacker & Ronkay, 1996

References
Natural History Museum Lepidoptera genus database
Owadaglaea at funet

Cuculliinae